Acanthomyrmex humilis is a species of ant that belongs to the genus Acanthomyrmex. It was described by Eguchi, Bui and Yamane in 2008, and is abundant in Vietnam.

References

humilis
Insects described in 2008
Insects of Vietnam